The Dioscoreales are an order of monocotyledonous flowering plants,  Within the monocots Dioscoreales are grouped in the lilioid monocots where they are in a sister group relationship with the Pandanales. As currently circumscribed by phylogenetic analysis using combined morphology and molecular methods, Dioscreales contains many reticulate veined vines in Dioscoraceae, it also includes the myco-heterotrophic Burmanniaceae and the autotrophic Nartheciaceae. The order consists of three families, 22 genera and about 850 species. The anthophytes are a grouping of plant taxa bearing flower-like reproductive structures. They were formerly thought to be a clade comprising plants bearing flower-like structures.  The group contained the angiosperms - the extant flowering plants, such as roses and grasses - as well as the Gnetales and the extinct Bennettitales.

23,420 species of vascular plant have been recorded in South Africa, making it the sixth most species-rich country in the world and the most species-rich country on the African continent. Of these, 153 species are considered to be threatened. Nine biomes have been described in South Africa: Fynbos, Succulent Karoo, desert, Nama Karoo, grassland, savanna, Albany thickets, the Indian Ocean coastal belt, and forests.

The 2018 South African National Biodiversity Institute's National Biodiversity Assessment plant checklist lists 35,130 taxa in the phyla Anthocerotophyta (hornworts (6)), Anthophyta (flowering plants (33534)), Bryophyta (mosses (685)), Cycadophyta (cycads (42)), Lycopodiophyta (Lycophytes(45)), Marchantiophyta (liverworts (376)), Pinophyta (conifers (33)), and Pteridophyta (cryptogams (408)).

Three families are represented in the literature. Listed taxa include species, subspecies, varieties, and forms as recorded, some of which have subsequently been allocated to other taxa as synonyms, in which cases the accepted taxon is appended to the listing. Multiple entries under alternative names reflect taxonomic revision over time.

Burmanniaceae
Family: Burmanniaceae,

Burmannia
Genus Burmannia:
 Burmannia madagascariensis Mart. indigenous

Dioscoreaceae
Family: Dioscoreaceae,

Dioscorea
Genus Dioscorea:
 Dioscorea brownii Schinz, endemic
 Dioscorea buchananii Benth. subsp. undatiloba (Baker) Wilkin, endemic
 Dioscorea burchellii Baker, endemic
 Dioscorea cotinifolia Kunth, indigenous
 Dioscorea crinita Hook.f. accepted as Dioscorea quartiniana A.Rich. present
 Dioscorea digitaria R.Knuth, accepted as Dioscorea multiloba Kunth, indigenous
 Dioscorea diversifolia Kunth, accepted as Dioscorea multiloba Kunth, indigenous
 Dioscorea dregeana (Kunth) T.Durand & Schinz, indigenous
 Dioscorea elephantipes (L'Her.) Engl. endemic
 Dioscorea hemicrypta Burkill, indigenous
 Dioscorea junodii Burtt Davy, accepted as Dioscorea buchananii Benth. subsp. undatiloba (Baker) Wilkin, indigenous
 Dioscorea microcuspis Baker, accepted as Dioscorea retusa Mast. present
 Dioscorea multiloba Kunth, indigenous
 Dioscorea mundii Baker, endemic
 Dioscorea natalensis R.Knuth, accepted as Dioscorea multiloba Kunth, indigenous
 Dioscorea quartiniana A.Rich. indigenous
 Dioscorea retusa Mast. indigenous
 Dioscorea rupicola Kunth, endemic
 Dioscorea stipulosa Uline ex R.Knuth, endemic
 Dioscorea strydomiana Wilkin, indigenous
 Dioscorea sylvatica Eckl. indigenous
 Dioscorea sylvatica Eckl. var. brevipes  (Burtt Davy) Burkill, indigenous
 Dioscorea sylvatica Eckl. var. multiflora (Marloth) Burkill, endemic
 Dioscorea sylvatica Eckl. var. paniculata (Dummer) Burkill, endemic
 Dioscorea sylvatica Eckl. var. rehmannii (Baker) Burkill, endemic
 Dioscorea sylvatica Eckl. var. sylvatica,  indigenous
 Dioscorea tysonii Baker, accepted as Dioscorea retusa Mast. 
 Dioscorea undatiloba Baker, accepted as Dioscorea buchananii Benth. subsp. undatiloba (Baker) Wilkin, endemic

Testudinaria
Genus Testudinaria:
 Testudinaria montana Burch. accepted as Dioscorea elephantipes (L'Her.) Engl.

Nartheciaceae
Family: Nartheciaceae,

Aletris
Genus Aletris:
 Aletris bifolia Burm.f. accepted as Lachenalia bulbifera (Cirillo) Engl. indigenous
 Aletris linguiformis Burm.f. accepted as Lachenalia punctata Jacq. indigenous

References

South African plant biodiversity lists
Dioscoreales